The Social Credit Party of Saskatchewan (originally known as the Social Credit League of Saskatchewan) was a political party in the Canadian province of Saskatchewan that promoted social credit economic theories from the mid-1930s to the mid-1970s.

Social Credit first appeared in Saskatchewan in the 1935 federal election, when the party received 20% of the popular vote and won two seats in Kindersley and The Battlefords.

The party fought its first election campaign in the 1938 provincial election, and won 15.90% of the popular vote. Because Saskatchewan, like the other provinces and the federal government of Canada, uses the 'first past the post' system for electing its Legislative Assembly, only two of the 40 Social Credit candidates won election in  52 seats available in the legislature. MP Joseph Needham was president of the provincial party in the 1930s into the 1940s.

In the subsequent election in 1944, Social Credit collapsed: it nominated only one candidate, who won only 249 votes (0.06% of the provincial popular vote).

Social Credit recovered somewhat in the 1948 provincial election, nominating 36 candidates and winning 8.09% of the popular vote.

In the 1956 provincial election, Social Credit nominated candidates in all 53 ridings, and won 21.48% of the popular vote, but only three of its candidates were elected.

Its vote fell to 12.35% in the 1960 election. Although the party nominated a few candidates in the two subsequent elections, (1964 and 1967), it could not win more than 0.45% of the popular vote or win a seat. The party did not contest elections after 1967.

Ed Nasserden, leader of the Progressive Conservative Party, called for the merger of the two parties in November 1970. The Social Credit and Progressive Conservative Parties entered into talks about merging from November 1970 to February 1971. The move was mostly supported by the Progressive Conservatives, as some members of the Social Credit Party were, according to former leader Lloyd Avram, "...skeptical of our ability to get our views of monetary reform across in a merged party."
Members of the Social Credit Party voted against a merger with the Progressive Conservative Party in February 1971. Following the vote, the Social Credit Party emerged as a divided party, and did not contest the 1971 and 1975 provincial elections. From 1971 to 1975 the Social Credit Party did not have a leader, and chose to focus on educating the people of Saskatchewan about the party's beliefs and values.

See also
Canadian social credit movement
Social Credit Party of Canada
List of Saskatchewan political parties
Politics of Saskatchewan

References

Saskatchewan
Provincial political parties in Saskatchewan
Defunct political parties in Canada
1930s establishments in Saskatchewan
Political parties established in the 1930s
1970s disestablishments in Saskatchewan
Political parties disestablished in the 1970s